Mufti Zar Wali Khan (1953 – 7 December 2020), was a Pakistani Islamic scholar, writer and Friday sermon preacher. He was the founder and the principal of Jamia Ahsan Ul Uloom.

Biography
Khan was born in Jehangira and studied at Jamia Uloom-ul-Islamia. He founded Jamia Arabia Ahsan Ul Uloom, Karachi in 1978.

Death
He died on 7 December 2020 at Indus Hospital in Karachi while under treatment for his ailments. His death was condoled by Imran Ismail, Noor-ul-Haq Qadri, Muhammad Rafi Usmani, Muhammad Taqi Usmani, Fazal-ur-Rehman, Sirajul Haq and Abdur Razzaq Iskander.

According to Dawn, media reports said that Khan had died due to the COVID-19. However, Qari Usman, a leader of Jamiat Ulama-e-Islam rejected this claim and said that Khan was a chronic cardiac patient and did not die due to the coronavirus.

References

1953 births
2020 deaths
People from Swabi District
Pakistani Sunni Muslim scholars of Islam
Pakistani Islamic religious leaders
Muslim missionaries
Deobandis
Jamia Uloom-ul-Islamia alumni